The Yamaha V9958 is a Video Display Processor used in the MSX2+ and MSX turbo R series of home computers, as the successor to the Yamaha V9938 used in the MSX2. The main new features are three graphical YJK modes with up to 19268 colors and horizontal scrolling registers. The V9958 was not as widely adopted as the V9938.

Specifications
 Video RAM: 128 KB + 64 KB of expanded VRAM
 Text modes: 80 x 24 and 32 x 24
 Resolution: 512 x 212 (4 or 16 colors out of 512) and 256 x 212 (16, 256, 12499 or 19268 colors)
 Sprites: 32, 16 colors, max 8 per horizontal line
 Hardware acceleration for copy, line, fill, etc.
 Interlacing to double vertical resolution
 Horizontal and vertical scroll registers

Feature changes from the V9938
The following features were added to or removed from the Yamaha V9938 specifications:

 Added horizontal scrolling registers
 Added YJK graphics modes (similar to YUV):
 G7 + YJK + YAE: 256 x 212, 12499 colors + 16 color palette
 G7 + YJK: 256 x 212, 19268 colors
 Added the ability to execute hardware accelerated commands in non-bitmap screen modes
 Removed lightpen and mouse functions
 Removed composite video output function

MSX-specific terminology
On MSX, the screen modes are often referred to by their assigned number in MSX BASIC. This mapping is as follows:

References

Graphics chips
MSX